Charlie Mungulda of Arnhem Land, in the Northern Territory of Australia, was the last native speaker of the Amurdak language in 2007.

Mungulda collaborated on a paper entitled "Survival, Social Cohesion and Rock Art: The Painted Hands of Western Arnhem Land, Australia" published in May 2020. , Mungulda's death has not been reported.

References 

History of the Northern Territory
Year of birth missing (living people)
Last known speakers of an Australian Aboriginal language
Living people